Megan is a Welsh feminine given name, originally a diminutive form of Margaret. Margaret is from the Greek μαργαρίτης (margarítēs), Latin margarīta, "pearl". Megan is one of the most popular Welsh-language names for women in Wales and England, and is commonly truncated to Meg. 

Megan was one of the most popular feminine names in the English-speaking world in the 1990s, peaking in 1990 in the United States and 1999 in the United Kingdom. Approximately 54% of people named Megan born in the US were born in 1990 or later. Megan is also frequently spelled Meagan, Meaghan, or Meghan outside of Wales and the rest of the United Kingdom due to spelling influence from Irish-language names.

People 

 Meagan Best (born 2002), Barbadian squash player
 Megan Bonnell, Canadian musician
 Meghan Boody (born 1964), American surrealist photographer
 Megan Boone (born 1983), American actress
 Megan Cunningham (born 1995), Scottish footballer
 Megan Danso (born 1990), Canadian actress
 Megan Davis, Australian human rights lawyer and academic
 Meggan Dawson-Farrell (born 1992), Scottish wheelchair racer
 Megan Fahlenbock (born 1971), Canadian actress
 Meagen Fay (born 1957), American actress
 Megan Fearon (born 1991), Irish politician
 Megan Follows (born 1968), Canadian actress
 Megan Fox (born 1986), American actress
 Meagan Good (born 1981), American actress
 Megan Gustafson (born 1996), American basketball player
 Megan Hart, American author
 Megan Hauserman (born 1981), American model and reality TV star
 Megan Hilty (born 1981), American actress
 Megan Jendrick (born 1984), American swimmer
 Megan Kanka (1986–1994), American murder victim
 Megyn Kelly (born 1970), American news anchor and journalist
 Meghan Klingenberg  (born 1988), American soccer player
 Megan Larsen (born 1962), New Zealand-born Australian-based organic skincare entrepreneur
 Megan Lloyd George (1902–1966), Welsh politician
 Megan Lukan (born 1992), Canadian rugby sevens player
 Megan Marie Hart (born 1983), American opera soprano
 Meghan, Duchess of Sussex (Rachel Meghan Markle; born 1981), former American actress and member of the British Royal Family
 Meaghan Martin, American actress
 Megan McKenna (born 1992), English actress and singer
 Megan McDonald (born 1959), American writer
 Megan McDonnell, American screenwriter
 Meagan Miller, American opera soprano
 Megan Mullally (born 1958), American actress
 Megan Pauwels (born 1976), Australian cricketer
 Megyn Price (born 1971), American actress
 Megan Rapinoe (born 1985), American soccer player
 Meaghan Rath, Canadian actress
 Meghan Roche (born 2000), American fashion model
 Meggan Rollandi, New Zealand artist
 Meggan Scavio, American businesswoman
 Megan Shackleton (born 1999), British Paralympic table tennis player
 Meghann Shaughnessy (born 1979), American tennis player
 Megan Shipman, American voice actress
 Megan Thee Stallion (born 1995), American rapper and singer-songwriter
 Megan Timpf (born 1984), Canadian softball player
 Meghan Trainor (born 1993), American singer/songwriter
 Megan Young (born 1990), Filipina-American actress and Miss World

Fictional characters
 M3GAN, a fictional robot prototype from a Universal Pictures horror movie.
 Meggan (character), a fictional comic book superhero appearing in books published by Marvel Comics
 Megan Adams, a character in the Australian television series Upright
 Meagan Aylward and Megan Hounsell, characters in the 2011 film Cyberbully
 Megan Carter, a character in the film Absence of Malice
 Meghann "Meggie" Cleary, the central character in The Thorn Birds
 Megan Draper, a character in the television series Mad Men
 Dr. Megan Eisenberg, a character in the film Father of the Bride Part II
 Pixie (Megan Gwynn), a fictional comic book superhero appearing in books published by Marvel Comics
 Megan "Meg" Griffin, a character in the television series Family Guy
 Megan Harries, owner of Cwmderi's chapel, Bethania, in the Welsh soap Pobol y Cwm
 Megan Macey, a character in the television series Emmerdale
 Megan Parker, a character in the television series Drake & Josh
 Megan Reed, a fictional neuroscientist appearing in the video game ‘’Deus Ex: Human Revolution’’ and ‘’Deus Ex: Mankind Divided’’
 Megan Sparkles, a character in the television series Sanjay and Craig
 Megan the Monday Fairy, a character from the Rainbow Magic book franchise
 Megan Voorhees, a minor character in Scary Movie 2
 Megan Williams, a character from the TV series My Little Pony
 Megan, a female background character that appears in the Recess franchise.

See also
 Mehigan, an Irish language surname that has the variants Megan, Meaghan and Meighan

References

Given names derived from gemstones
Welsh feminine given names
English feminine given names
Scottish feminine given names